General elections were held in Antigua and Barbuda on 12 March 2009. The result was a victory for the United Progressive Party, which won nine of the seventeen elected seats in the House of Representatives.

Conduct
Three days before the elections the Chamber of Commerce announced observations of voter registration irregularities and called for an investigation into the matter. For example, in the Saint Peter constituency, voter registration increased by 41%.

A three-member observation team from Belize, Canada, and Guyana observed the election.

Results

Aftermath
On 31 March 2010, a judge nullified the election of UPP's leader Spencer and two other UPP MPs, calling the UPP's majority into question. However, on 24 October the Court of Appeal of the Eastern Caribbean Supreme Court overturned the High Court's decision and decided that the three MPs were duly elected.

References

Antigua
Elections in Antigua and Barbuda
2009 in Antigua and Barbuda
March 2009 events in North America